The Dodge Dynasty is a mid-size four-door sedan that was marketed by the Dodge division of Chrysler Corporation from the 1988 to 1993 model years.  Serving as the direct successor of the Dodge 600 sedan, the Dynasty was slotted between the Dodge Spirit and Dodge Monaco in the Dodge sedan line.     

One of the largest Chrysler K-car variants, the Dynasty used the front-wheel drive Chrysler C/AC platform, sharing its body with the 1988-1993 Chrysler New Yorker.  The 1990-1993 Chrysler New Yorker Fifth Avenue and Chrysler Imperial share their underpinnings with the Dynasty/New Yorker, but use an extended-wheelbase chassis, denoted the Chrysler Y platform (the longest-wheelbase sedan variant of the K-car).   

The Dodge Dynasty was assembled by Chrysler at its Belvidere Assembly Plant facility (Belvidere, Illinois) alongside the Chrysler New Yorker, New Yorker Fifth Avenue, and Imperial. The final vehicle was produced on May 28, 1993.  For the 1993 model year, Dodge introduced the Dodge Intrepid as its largest sedan line, replacing both the Dynasty and the Monaco.

History
Although it was fairly popular, the Lee Iacocca-dictated styling was boxy and conservative compared to more aerodynamically styled competitors such as the Ford Taurus and the Chevrolet Lumina.  When the new front-wheel-drive Chrysler Corporation C-body cars (Dynasty and New Yorker) debuted for the 1988 model year, they were the first mass-produced cars in the world to have a fully multiplexed, fiber-optic wiring buss connecting all electronic accessories and controllers, which greatly reduced the amount and weight of wiring harnesses in the car.  All models (1988-1993) featured power locks that automatically locked when the car's speed exceeded 15 miles per hour. Dynasty trim levels included base, Premium (1988 only) and LE. Additionally, a "Brougham" package was offered on 1992-93 LE models that added a padded "landau" vinyl roof.

Specifications

A 2.5-litre inline-4 Chrysler engine (base model only), a Mitsubishi-sourced 3.0-litre V6, the 6G72 engine, and a Chrysler-built 3.3-litre V6 were available, although the 3.3 L V6 was not available until 1990. The four-cylinder came equipped with a TorqueFlite three-speed automatic transmission (the A413), as did the 3.0 L in 1988. The 1988 3.0L V6 models with TorqueFlite transmission were rated at 18 city / 24 highway MPG. The 1989-1990 Ultradrive equipped models came with a 2.36:1 axle ratio, which was revised to 2.52:1 for 1991 to 1993. EPA mileage ratings were 21 city/25 highway MPG with the 4 cylinder & 3-speed TorqueFlite transmission. In 1989 the EPA rating for the 3.0/Ultradrive power-train changed to 18 city / 26 highway MPG. Also, the 3.0 engine is a non-interference engine, meaning that if the timing belt breaks, it is less likely to damage valves and pistons when it does so.

The new 3.3L V6 engine for 1990, with the Ultradrive transmission, was rated at 19 city/ 26 highway MPG. The new electronically controlled four-speed automatic transmission, known as the Ultradrive or A604 (List of Chrysler transmissions), debuted in 1989, and became the sole transmission for V6 models through the 1993 final production year of the Dynasty. In 1989 the EPA rating for the 3.0/Ultradrive power-train changed to 18 city / 26 highway MPG.  The new 3.3L V6 engine for 1990, with the Ultradrive transmission, was rated at 19 city/ 26 highway MPG.

Features

The Dynasty was offered in Base (1988-1993), Premium (1988 only), LE (1988-1993) and Brougham trim levels, the latter offered on LE models, adding a padded "landau" vinyl roof (1992-1993).

Most Dynasty models were equipped with V6 engines, and four-cylinder engines were marketed to fleets. All were equipped with a driver's side airbag starting in 1990.  A Bendix anti-lock braking system (including 4-wheel disc brakes) (note 2 anti-lock systems where used on C/AC cars Bendix & bosch) was available on V6 models during those years as well. The 1993 models featured a stainless steel exhaust system and a tamper-proof odometer.

The 1988 LE models featured rear headrests, which were deleted for 1989-1993. Early production models (1988-1990) featured standard cornering lamps and remote fuel door release even on base trim models. By 1991-1993 those features were gradually removed from all Dodge passenger cars. By 1993, the only Dodge products that offered a remote fuel door release were the minivans and trucks, but in the late 1980s, (following is incorrect) this was standard on every Chrysler Corporation car including the Omni and Horizon twins. The base models lost cornering lamps for 1991, and the LE models lost them for 1992.

Leather seats were optional on the LE models, but very few were so equipped.  Also available were load-leveling suspension, 14-inch alloy wheels, wire wheel covers, illuminated entry system, Infinity stereo with equalizer and power antenna, power trunk pull-down, dual 6-way power seats, with memory available for driver's seat, and power outside mirrors.

Production

Canada and Mexico

In Canada and Mexico, Chrysler marketed the model line under the Chrysler Dynasty nameplate.   Chrysler of Canada replaced the Dodge 600 with the Dodge Spirit, with the Chrysler Dynasty replacing the Chrysler LeBaron GTS hatchback (and ultimately, the Dodge Diplomat, as the Dodge Monaco was not marketed in Canada).

Within the model line, the Dynasty was slotted between the LeBaron sedan and the New Yorker.  Largely identical to the base-trim Chrysler New Yorker Salon introduced in 1990, the Chrysler Dynasty received its own grille.  In Canada, both four-cylinder and V6 engines were offered; only V6 engines were offered in Mexico.

References 

Dodge vehicles
Front-wheel-drive vehicles
Mid-size cars
Sedans
Cars introduced in 1987
1990s cars
Cars discontinued in 1993